The Dent du Bourgo (1,909 m) is a mountain of the Swiss Prealps, located east of Gruyères in the canton of Fribourg. It lies on the range north of the Vanil Noir, between the valleys of the Sarine and the Motélon.

References

External links
 Dent du Bourgo on Hikr

Mountains of Switzerland
Mountains of the Alps
Mountains of the canton of Fribourg
One-thousanders of Switzerland